Speedbumps: Flooring It Through Hollywood is a 2006 autobiography written by actress Teri Garr with Henriette Mantel. It is also available as an audiobook read by Teri Garr.

This work details her career, which spans over four decades, and her health struggles following her diagnosis with multiple sclerosis.

References 

2006 books
American autobiographies
Books about actors
Multiple sclerosis